John Robinson (1715–1745) was an English portrait-painter and draughtsman.

Life 
John Robinson was born at Bath in 1715. He studied under John Vanderbank, and attained some success as a portrait-painter. Having married a wife with a fortune, he, on the death of Charles Jervas, purchased that painter's house in Cleveland Court. He thus inherited a fashionable practice; but he had not skill enough to keep it up. He dressed many of his sitters in the costume of portraits by Vandyck.

Robinson died in 1745, before completing his thirtieth year. A portrait of Lady Charlotte Finch by Robinson was engraved in mezzotint by John Faber the Younger, and the title of the print subsequently altered to The Amorous Beauty.

References

Citations

Bibliography 

 
 Cust, L. H.; Herring, Sarah (2004). "Robinson, John (1715–1745), portrait painter". In Oxford Dictionary of National Biography. Oxford University Press.
 Oliver, Valerie Cassel, ed. (2011). "Robinson, John I". In Benezit Dictionary of Artists. Oxford University Press.
 Redgrave, Samuel; Redgrave, Francis Margaret (1878). "ROBINSON, John". In A Dictionary of Artists of the English School. London: George Bell & Sons.

1715 births
1745 deaths
18th-century English painters
English portrait painters